S56 may refer to:

Aircraft 
 Blériot-SPAD S.56, a family of prototype French airliners
 Savoia-Marchetti S.56, an Italian flying boat
 Sikorsky S-56, an American helicopter
 Sukhoi S-56, a proposed Russian carrier fighter

Other uses 
 S56 (Long Island bus)
 S56 (New York City bus) serving Staten Island
 County Route S56 (Bergen County, New Jersey)
 Explorer S-56 (satellite), a failed American spacecraft
 GER Class S56, a British steam locomotive
 , a submarine of the Indian Navy
 Prince Skyline (S56), a Japanese automobile
 S56: Dispose of this material and its container at hazardous or special waste collection point, a safety phrase
 
 Siemens S56, a Siemens mobile phone